The Greatest Hits was a compilation album self-released by Babybird (aka Stephen Jones) in 1997. When it was released, Atlantic Records helped market a release of the album distributed by the Alternative Distribution Alliance. It consists of 20 songs, chosen by a vote of British consumers, each taken from one of Babybird's five previous indie albums. Atlantic's goal in marketing the album was to introduce Americans to Jones' numerous songs, none of which had previously been widely available in the United States.

Critical reception

As AllMusic put it, "Of course, the title is ironic -- irony is one of Stephen Jones/Baby Bird's fortes. It's ironic because the double-disc Greatest Hits doesn't contain "You're Gorgeous," the number two U.K. single that established his career. It's ironic because Greatest Hits is Baby Bird's first U.S. release, meaning that he hasn't had time to have any hits, let alone great ones."

Track listing
All tracks written and composed by Stephen Jones.

Disc one
 "Goddamn It, You're a Kid" – 3:07
 "Man's Tight Vest" – 4:14
 "KW Jesus TV Roof Appeal" – 3:58
 "Bad Blood" – 3:54
 "Kiss Your Country" – 4:04
 "Hong Kong Blues" – 3:35
 "Razorblade Shower" – 3:55
 "Sha Na Na" – 2:42
 "Aluminium Beach" – 4:34
 "Alison" – 3:38
 "Why" – 2:37
 "I Didn't Want to Wake You Up" – 3:25

Disc two
 "Grandma Begs to Be 18 Again" – 2:35
 "I Was Never Here" – 3:53
 "Petrol Cigarette" – 2:35
 "Losing My Hair" – 3:42
 "Saturday" – 2:29
 "Invisible Tune" – 4:02
 "Failed Old Singer" – 3:34
 "Swinging from Tree to Tree" – 2:37
 "Not About a Girl" – 2:32
 "In the Morning" – 2:13
 "Past Lasts Longer" – 3:13 (not listed on the discs or the artwork)
 "Good Night" – 3:24 (not listed on the discs or the artwork)

References

External links
The Greatest Hits at Bad Pages
The Greatest Hits at Rate Your Music

Babybird albums
1997 compilation albums
Self-released albums